The 1991 XXVII FIBA International Christmas Tournament "Trofeo Raimundo Saporta-Memorial Fernando Martín" was the 27th edition of the FIBA International Christmas Tournament. It took place at Palacio de Deportes de la Comunidad de Madrid, Madrid, Spain, on 24, 25 and 26 December 1991 with the participations of Real Madrid Asegurator (runners-up of the 1990–91 FIBA Korać Cup), Maccabi Elite Tel Aviv (champions of the 1990–91 Ligat HaAl), Australia and Benetton Treviso (5th of the 1990–91 Serie A1 FIP).

League stage

Day 1, December 24, 1991

|}

Day 2, December 25, 1991

|}

Day 3, December 26, 1991

|}

Final standings

References

1991–92 in European basketball
1991–92 in Israeli basketball
1991–92 in Italian basketball
1991–92 in Spanish basketball